Kelly Scott (born 1977) is a Canadian curler.

Kelly, Kelley or Kelli Scott may also refer to:

Kelly Scott (American football), head football coach of Webber International University since 2006
Kelly Scott, presenter on Real Radio XS (Digital)
Kelli Scott, drummer with the bands Failure and Enemy
Kelley Scott (born c. 1980), Miss Oklahoma in 2003

See also
Scott Kelly (disambiguation)